Midday refers to noon, the time of the middle of the day-light period when the sun is at its highest point.

Midday may also refer to:

Television
 Midday (Canadian TV program), a 1985–2000 Canadian television newsmagazine television program
 Midday (Australian TV program), a 1985–1998 Australian variety program
 Midday (Irish talk show), a 2008–2016 Irish talk show

Other
 Lady Midday, a Slavic demon
 Midday (horse), British-trained thoroughbred racehorse foaled in 2006
 Mid-Day, a compact newspaper in India
 Midday (painting), by Evgenia Antipova
 Southern Italy (Italian: Mezzogiorno, literally "Midday"), referring to the southern portion of the country
 Southern France (French: Midi standing for "Midday"), referring to the southern portion of the country
 Mid Day, a named train of the PATrain commuter rail service